Honeymoons is a 2009 Serbian-Albanian drama film directed by Goran Paskaljević.

Synopsis 
Hoping for a better life, two young couples leave their respective countries. Maylinda and Nik leave Albania by boat to Italy, to live their forbidden love. Meanwhile, Vera and Marko leave Serbia by train for Austria, through Hungary. Marko, a talented cellist, is lucky enough to enter the famous Vienna Philharmonic Orchestra. But when they arrive at the border, although they have visas in order, their problems begin.

Cast 
 Nebojša Milovanović as Marko
 Jelena Trkulja as Vera
 Jozef Shiroka as Nik
 Mirela Naska as Maylinda
 Lazar Ristovski as Vera's Uncle
 Petar Božović as Vera's Father
 Bujar Lako as Nik's Father
 Yllka Mujo as Nik's Mother
 Aron Balazs as Hungarian Cop
 Mira Banjac as Stana
 Klodian Hoxha as Ilir
 Zinaida Dedakin as Vera's Aunt

References

External links 

2009 drama films
2009 films
Albanian drama films
Serbian drama films
Films set in Albania
Films set in Italy
Films set in Serbia
2000s Serbian-language films